Francis Edward Allcock (7 September 1925 – June 2005) was a professional footballer, who played in The Football League for Bristol Rovers between 1952 and 1956.

Allcock, who was born in Nottingham, played youth team football for Beeston Boys Club, before joining local League side Nottingham Forest at the end of World War II. He spent a year with Forest prior to the resumption of normal Football League matches, and joined Aston Villa in 1946, where he failed to make an impression on the first team. He had a spell playing non-League football with Cheltenham Town, until returning to the professional game in 1952, when he joined Bristol Rovers.

In a four-year spell with The Pirates he played in 59 League games, before being forced to retire in 1956 with a serious knee injury.

References

1925 births
2005 deaths
Footballers from Nottingham
English footballers
Association football defenders
English Football League players
Nottingham Forest F.C. players
Aston Villa F.C. players
Cheltenham Town F.C. players
Bristol Rovers F.C. players